Cerocala orientalis  is a moth of the family Erebidae.

Distribution
It is found in Cochinchina (southern Vietnam).

References

Ophiusina
Moths described in 1912